The 1953–54 Illinois Fighting Illini men’s basketball team represented the University of Illiniois.

Regular season
In his seventh year at Illinois, Harry Combes continued to offer the fans of the Fighting Illini a successful team that they could be follow across the country to record crowds. The 1953-54 team returned one of the most dominant players in the NCAA, Johnny "Red" Kerr.  During the season, Kerr shattered Illinois’ single-season scoring record by tallying 556 points in his senior year. Kerr’s 1,299 career points in three seasons currently ranks 20th on the all-time Illinois scoring list.  After his Illinois career came to an end, Kerr started a 12-year professional career followed by becoming the first head coach of the Chicago Bulls in 1966.

The 1954 team added twin brothers, Paul and Phil Judson from Hebron, Illinois, Bruce Brothers and Bill Ridley as sophomores.  A youth movement that helped the Illini finish in a 3rd place tie in the Big Ten. Unfortunately the Illini would lose 5 total games with three of the five losses coming at the hands of ranked opponents.  The starting lineup included captain John Kerr at the center position, Jim Wright and Paul Judson at guard and Bruce Brothers and Max Hooper at the forward slots.

Roster

Source

Schedule
												
Source																
												

|-
!colspan=12 style="background:#DF4E38; color:white;"| Non-Conference regular season

|-
!colspan=9 style="background:#DF4E38; color:#FFFFFF;"|Big Ten regular season

|-					

Bold Italic connotes conference game

Rankings

Player stats

Awards and honors
Johnny Kerr
Helms 2nd Team All-American
Look Magazine 3rd Team All-American
Associated Press 3rd Team All-American
United Press International 3rd Team All-American
Converse Honorable Mention All-American
Team Most Valuable Player

Team players drafted into the NBA

Rankings

References

Illinois Fighting Illini
Illinois Fighting Illini men's basketball seasons
1953 in sports in Illinois
1954 in sports in Illinois